Asa Branca: Um Sonho Brasileiro is a 1981 Brazilian drama film directed by Djalma Limongi Batista. Its plot follows the trajectory of Antônio "Asa Branca" dos Reis, a footballer who starts in Mariana do Sul, a fictional city of the interior of São Paulo, until he reaches a FIFA World Cup.

Cast
Edson Celulari as Antônio "Asa Branca" dos Reis
Eva Wilma as Asa Branca's mother
Walmor Chagas as Isaías
Gianfrancesco Guarnieri as Toninho
Rita Cadillac as Sylvia
Regina Wilker as Cleyse
Mira Haar as Sulamitinha "Rita Pavone"
Geraldo Del Rey as Asa Branca's father

Production
The filming took place in three months; the first scenes were shot in São Paulo, with the staff moving to Santa Bárbara d'Oeste, and then Rio de Janeiro.

Reception
At the 14th Brasília Film Festival Batista won the Best Director Award, Celulari won the Best Actor Award, and Chagas won the Best Supporting Actor Award. Batista and Celulari would win the same awards at the 10th Gramado Film Festival. It also won the Air France Award for Best Film, Best Director, and Best Actor. It was also entered into the 1982 Three Continents Festival.

References

External links

1980s sports drama films
1981 films
Brazilian association football films
Brazilian sports drama films
Films shot in Rio de Janeiro (city)
Films shot in São Paulo
1980s Portuguese-language films
1981 directorial debut films
1981 drama films